This is a list of National Hockey League (NHL) players who have played at the least one game in the NHL from 1917 to present and have a last name that starts with "K".

List updated as of the 2018–19 NHL season.

Ka 

 Jari Kaarela
 Robert Kabel
 Frantisek Kaberle
 Tomas Kaberle
 Mark Kachowski
 Eddie Kachur
 Nazem Kadri
 Trent Kaese
 Kaapo Kahkonen
 Dominik Kahun
 Alexei Kaigorodov
 Vern Kaiser
 Kaapo Kakko
 Walter "Jeff" Kalbfleisch
 Alex Kaleta
 Patrick Kaleta
 Dmitri Kalinin
 Sergey Kalinin
 Jon Kalinski
 Arthur Kaliyev
 Tomi Kallio
 Anders Kallur
 Petr Kalus
 Wyatt Kalynuk
 Vladislav Kamenev
 Valeri Kamensky
 Kevin Kaminski
 Max Kaminsky
 Yan Kaminsky
 David Kampf
 Steven Kampfer
 Rudolph "Bingo" Kampman
 Hannu Kamppuri
 Tomas Kana
 Boyd Kane
 Evander Kane
 Frank "Red" Kane
 Patrick Kane
 Petr Kanko
 Gordon Kannegiesser
 Sheldon Kannegiesser
 Kasperi Kapanen
 Niko Kapanen
 Sami Kapanen
 Michael Kapla
 Kirill Kaprizov
 Ladislav Karabin
 Mike Karakas
 Jere Karalahti
 Vitali Karamnov
 Paul Kariya
 Steve Kariya
 Kyosti Karjalainen
 Al Karlander
 Andreas Karlsson
 Erik Karlsson
 Henrik Karlsson
 Melker Karlsson
 Dave Karpa
 Valeri Karpov
 Alexander Karpovtsev
 Martins Karsums
 Alexei Kasatonov
 Jason Kasdorf
 David Kase
 Ondrej Kase
 Kasimir Kaskisuo
 Steve Kasper
 Matt Kassian
 Zack Kassian
 Ed Kastelic
 Mike Kaszycki
 Mark Katic
 Martin Kaut
 Pat Kavanagh

Ke 

 Ed Kea
 Mike Keane
 Doug Keans
 Bracken Kearns
 Dennis Kearns
 Jackie Keating
 John "Red" Keating
 Mike Keating
 Gordon "Duke" Keats
 Dan Keczmer
 Sheldon Keefe
 Melville "Butch" Keeling
 Don Keenan
 Larry Keenan
 Brady Keeper
 Matt Keetley
 Rick Kehoe
 Duncan Keith
 Matt Keith
 Jarmo Kekalainen
 Chris Kelleher
 Clayton Keller
 Ralph Keller
 Ryan Keller
 Christer Kellgren
 Joel Kellman
 Bob Kelly (born 1946)
 Bob Kelly (born 1950)
 Dave Kelly
 John-Paul Kelly
 Leonard "Red" Kelly
 Pete Kelly
 Pep Kelly
 Steve Kelly
 Kevin Kemp
 Stan Kemp
 Adrian Kempe
 Mario Kempe
 Michal Kempny
 Joonas Kemppainen
 Chris Kenady
 Bill Kendall
 Dean Kennedy
 Forbes Kennedy
 Mike Kennedy
 Sheldon Kennedy
 Ted Kennedy
 Tim Kennedy
 Tyler Kennedy
 Ernie Kenny
 Dave Keon
 Michael Keranen
 Alexander Kerch
 Nicolas Kerdiles
 Alexander Kerfoot
 Tanner Kero
 Alan Kerr
 Dave Kerr
 Reg Kerr
 Tim Kerr
 Dan Kesa
 Ryan Kesler
 Phil Kessel
 Rick Kessell
 Veli-Pekka Ketola
 Kerry Ketter

Kh–Ki 

 Nikolai Khabibulin
 Jujhar Khaira
 Sergei Kharin
 Alexander Kharitonov
 Alexander Khavanov
 Yuri Khmylev
 Alexander Khokhlachev
 Dmitri Khristich
 Anton Khudobin
 Ian Kidd
 Trevor Kidd
 Matt Kiersted
 Udo Kiessling
 Chad Kilger
 Alexander Killorn
 Brian Kilrea
 Hec Kilrea
 Ken Kilrea
 Wally Kilrea
 Darin Kimble
 Jakub Kindl
 Orest Kindrachuk
 Derek King
 Dwight King
 Frank King
 Jason King
 Kris King
 Scott King
 Steven King
 Wayne King
 Keith Kinkaid
 Geordie Kinnear
 Geoff Kinrade
 Brian Kinsella
 Ray Kinsella
 Marko Kiprusoff
 Miikka Kiprusoff
 Bobby Kirk
 Bob Kirkpatrick
 Mark Kirton
 Bogdan Kiselevich
 Kelly Kisio
 Bill Kitchen
 Chapman "Hobie" Kitchen
 Mike Kitchen
 Joel Kiviranta
 Matiss Kivlenieks

Kj–Kn 

 Patric Kjellberg
 Linus Klasen
 Ralph Klassen
 Trent Klatt
 Ken Klee
 Oscar Klefbom
 Kevin Klein
 Lloyd "Dede" Klein
 Scot Kleinendorst
 Terry Kleisinger
 Anton Klementyev
 Jon Klemm
 Jakub Klepis
 Rostislav Klesla
 Petr Klima
 Morgan Klimchuk
 Sergei Klimovich
 Ike Klingbeil
 Carl Klingberg
 Rob Klinkhammer
 Justin Kloos
 Tomas Kloucek
 Joe Klukay
 Gord Kluzak
 Julian Klymkiw
 Connor Knapp
 Bill Knibbs
 Rick Knickle
 Corban Knight
 Fred Knipscheer
 William "Nick" Knott
 Paul Knox
 Mike Knuble
 Espen Knutsen
 Nikolai Knyzhov

Ko 

 Matt Koalska
 Chuck Kobasew
 Dieter Kochan
 David Koci
 Joe Kocur
 Greg Koehler
 Dustin Kohn
 Ladislav Kohn
 Ville Koistinen
 Tom Koivisto
 Mikko Koivu
 Saku Koivu
 Otto Koivula
 Krys Kolanos
 Chad Kolarik
 Pavel Kolarik
 Keegan Kolesar
 Mark Kolesar
 Vitali Kolesnik
 Juraj Kolnik
 Dean Kolstad
 Konstantin Koltsov
 Olaf Kolzig
 Neil Komadoski
 Zenith Komarniski
 Mike Komisarek
 Leo Komarov
 Mike Komisarek
 Matt Konan
 Maxim Kondratyev
 Travis Konecny
 George Konik
 Zenon Konopka
 Steve Konowalchuk
 Steve Konroyd
 Evgeny Konstantinov
 Vladimir Konstantinov
 Petri Kontiola
 Chris Kontos
 Russ Kopak
 Tomas Kopecky
 Anze Kopitar
 Jerry Korab
 Dan Kordic
 John Kordic
 Josef Korenar
 Jim Korn
 Mike Korney
 Evgeny Korolev
 Igor Korolev
 Cliff Koroll
 Alexander Korolyuk
 Lauri Korpikoski
 Joonas Korpisalo
 Egor Korshkov
 Roger Kortko
 Scott Kosmachuk
 Kalle Kossila
 Klim Kostin
 Andrei Kostitsyn
 Sergei Kostitsyn
 Michael Kostka
 Tom Kostopoulos
 Doug Kostynski
 Ales Kotalik
 Dick Kotanen
 Jesperi Kotkaniemi
 Chris Kotsopoulos
 Ilya Kovalchuk
 Andrei Kovalenko
 Alexei Kovalev
 Joe Kowal
 Don Kozak
 Les Kozak
 Viktor Kozlov
 Vyacheslav Kozlov

Kr 

 Milan Kraft
 Ryan Kraft
 Steve Kraftcheck
 Brent Krahn
 Lukas Krajicek
 Skip Krake
 Igor Kravchuk
 Mikhail Kravets
 Vitali Kravtsov
 Chris Kreider
 David Krejci
 Dale Krentz
 Peyton Krebs
 Kamil Kreps
 Jordan Krestanovich
 Jaroslav Kristek
 Sergei Krivokrasov
 Jason Krog
 Joe Krol
 Richard Kromm
 Robert Kron
 Niklas Kronwall
 Staffan Kronwall
 Kevin Krook
 Vlastimil Kroupa
 Torey Krug
 Marcus Kruger
 Jim Krulicki
 Uwe Krupp
 Gord Kruppke
 Paul Kruse
 Mike Krushelnyski
 Vladimir Krutov
 Todd Krygier
 Dave Kryskow
 Ed Kryzanowski

Ku–Ky 

 Filip Kuba
 Dominik Kubalik
 Tomas Kubalik
 Pavel Kubina
 Frantisek Kucera
 Nikita Kucherov
 Alexei Kudashov
 Bob Kudelski
 Kristian Kudroc
 Darcy Kuemper
 Ryan Kuffner
 Karson Kuhlman
 Gordon "Doggie" Kuhn
 Tom Kuhnhackl
 Dean Kukan
 Lasse Kukkonen
 Aggie Kukulowicz
 Brett Kulak
 Stu Kulak
 Arturs Kulda
 Nikolay Kulemin
 Mikhail Kuleshov
 Dmitri Kulikov
 Arnie Kullman
 Ed Kullman
 Jarno Kultanen
 Mark Kumpel
 Tomas Kundratek
 Luke Kunin
 Chris Kunitz
 Les Kuntar
 Alan Kuntz
 Murray Kuntz
 Cody Kunyk
 Janne Kuokkanen
 Rasmus Kupari
 Sean Kuraly
 Philipp Kurashev
 Tomas Kurka
 Jari Kurri
 Gary Kurt
 Orland Kurtenbach
 Justin Kurtz
 Tom Kurvers
 Merve Kuryluk
 Dale Kushner
 Zdenek Kutlak
 Evgeny Kuznetsov
 Maxim Kuznetsov
 Greg Kuznik
 Ken Kuzyk
 Dmitri Kvartalnov
 Oleg Kvasha
 Joel Kwiatkowski
 Larry "King" Kwong
 Bill Kyle
 Walter "Gus" Kyle
 Oliver Kylington
 Markku Kyllonen
 Nick Kypreos
 Jordan Kyrou
 Jim Kyte
 Milan Kytnar

See also
 hockeydb.com NHL Player List - K

Players